Bryanna Ashley McCarthy (born October 13, 1991) is a Canadian professional soccer player and member of the Canada women's national soccer team. She last played for German club BV Cloppenburg in the 2. Bundesliga.

Early life
Born in Toronto, Ontario, McCarthy's mother was born in Saint Vincent and the Grenadines while her father was born in Jamaica. She grew up in Ajax playing basketball, volleyball, track, soccer and golf with her and her fathers' personal coach Karim Corringham.

West Virginia University
McCarthy attended West Virginia University.

Playing career

Club career
On January 11, 2013, as part of the NWSL Player Allocation, McCarthy joined the Western New York Flash. Despite this, McCarthy only played 15 minutes for the Flash and her allocation was not picked up for the following year.

In 2014, McCarthy signed with the Ottawa Fury in the W-League. She signed for German Bundesliga club SC Sand in 2015, and then later for 2. Bundesliga club BV Cloppenburg.

International career
In 2006, McCarthy was 14 years old when she made her debut in the Canadian youth program. She won a bronze medal at the 2008 CONCACAF Women's Under-17 Championship and  represented Canada at the FIFA U-17 Women's World Cup in New Zealand the same year.

In June 2010, she made her debut for Canada's senior team at just 18 years old. She finished fourth with Canada at the 2010 CONCACAF Under-20 Women's Championship in Guatemala.  In 2011, she finished first with Canada at the 2011 Cyprus Cup.

In 2012, she finished second with Canada at the 2012 Cyprus Cup.

References

External links
 
 
 
 Western New York Flash player profile

1991 births
Living people
Canadian people of Saint Vincent and the Grenadines descent
Canadian people of Jamaican descent
Black Canadian soccer players
Soccer players from Toronto
Canadian women's soccer players
Canada women's international soccer players
USL W-League (1995–2015) players
National Women's Soccer League players
Western New York Flash players
West Virginia Mountaineers women's soccer players
Canadian expatriate women's soccer players
Expatriate women's soccer players in the United States
Expatriate women's footballers in Germany
Women's association football defenders
Ottawa Fury (women) players
Toronto Lady Lynx players
SC Sand players
BV Cloppenburg (women) players
Canadian expatriate sportspeople in Germany